Dixonius dulayaphitakorum is a species of lizard in the family Gekkonidae. It is endemic to Thailand.

References

Dixonius
Reptiles described in 2020
Endemic fauna of Thailand
Reptiles of Thailand